The 1973 World Table Tennis Championships – Corbillon Cup (women's team) was the 25th edition of the women's team championship.

South Korea won the gold medal, China won the silver medal and Japan won the bronze medal.

Medalists

Final tables

Group A

Group B

Final group

See also
List of World Table Tennis Championships medalists

References

-
1973 in women's table tennis